Hotărani may refer to several villages in Romania:

 Hotărani, a village in Vânjuleț Commune, Mehedinți County
 Hotărani, a village in Fărcașele Commune, Olt County